Zangarak (also Romanized as Zangārak; also known as Zainkarak) is a village in Farmahin Rural District, in the Central District of Farahan County, Markazi Province, Iran. At the 2006 census, its population was 367, in 106 families.

References 

Populated places in Farahan County